Doug Woodward (born September 12, 1958) is a former American football quarterback in the USFL who played for the Boston/New Orleans/Portland Breakers and New Jersey Generals. He played college football for the Pace Setters. He also played in the Canadian Football League for the Calgary Stampeders.

References

1958 births
Living people
American football quarterbacks
Canadian football quarterbacks
Boston/New Orleans/Portland Breakers players
New Jersey Generals players
Calgary Stampeders players
Pace Setters football players